is a Japanese manga artist and the former president of Kyoto Seika University.

Career 
Keiko Takemiya (or Takemiya Keiko) is included in the Year 24 Group, a term coined by academics and critics to refer to a group of female authors in the early 1970s who helped transform  manga (manga for girls) from being created primarily by male authors to being created by female authors. As part of this group, Takemiya pioneered a genre of  manga about love between young men called  ( "boy love"). In 1970, she published a historical short story titled Sunroom Nite ("In the Sunroom") in Bessatsu Shōjo Comic, which is possibly the first  manga ever published. Illustrating a tragic romance between a Romani boy and his wealthy classmate, it contains the earliest known male–male kiss in  manga.

Takemiya cites her influences as being  manga (manga for boys), the works of Shotaro Ishinomori, films, and documentaries. After that, she traveled to different parts of Europe on an almost annual basis.

Among her best known works are the manga  and Toward the Terra, which are noted for being pioneering series of the 1970s and 1980s. She is regarded as "one of the first successful crossover women artists" to create both  and  manga. In 1983, Takemiya served as a special designer on the theatrical anime film Crusher Joe: The Movie, alongside other notable manga artists.

Since 2000, Takemiya has taught at Kyoto Seika University's Faculty of Manga. She served as Dean of the Faculty of Manga from April 2008 until March 2013. She was also president of the university from April 2014 to March 2018. During her tenure at Kyoto Seika, Takemiya started the  project, which uses digital technology to create accurate reproductions of manga artwork and manuscripts, for both its preservation and to produce material suitable for art exhibitions, with a focus on  manga art.

From 2009 to 2014, she served as a member of the selection committee for the Tezuka Osamu Cultural Prizes. In 2012, she received the Japan Cartoonists Association's Minister of Education, Culture, Sports, Science and Technology Award in recognition of her entire body of work. In 2014, she was awarded the Medal of Honor with Purple Ribbon by the Ministry of Internal Affairs and Communications of Japan for her contributions to manga.

In January 2016, Takemiya published her first autobiography, . In March 2021, she published her second autobiography, . Its text was compiled from Takemiya's interviews with journalist Keiko Chino, first published in the  column of the  newspaper.

Takemiya's work is featured in the catalogue for The Citi Exhibition: Manga (2019), including an interview where she discusses the Genga (Dash) project (pages 253-267).

Works

 , 1968
 , 1970
 , 1971–1972
 , 1973
 , 1974–1976
 , 1975
 , 1976–1984
 , 1979–1980
 , 1981–1986
 , 1977–1980
 First published in English by Vertical as To Terra..., later by Manga Planet as Toward the Terra
 , with Ryu Mitsuse (original story,) 1980–1982
 First published in English by Vertical as Andromeda Stories, later by Manga Planet as Stories of Andromeda Galaxy
 , 1982–1987
 , 1984
 5:00 PM Revolution, 1985–1988
 , 1988–1990
 , 1990–1993
 , 1991–2000
 , 1994–1995
 , 1997
 , 1998–1999
 , 2000–2004

References

Further reading

External links

  
 Official 50th anniversary exhibition website
 Keiko Takemiya at The Encyclopedia of Science Fiction
 
 

 
1950 births
20th-century Japanese women writers
Female comics writers
Japanese female comics artists
Living people
Manga artists from Kanagawa Prefecture
Manga artists from Tokushima Prefecture
People from Kamakura
People from Tokushima (city)
Presidents of universities and colleges in Japan
Recipients of the Medal with Purple Ribbon
Women heads of universities and colleges
Women manga artists